Sibsu, also spelt Sibsoo is a settlement in the far west of Bhutan. It is located in Samtse District, close to the border with India. Sibsu is home to Shivalaya Mandir Temple and Pinjuli School.

References
Armington, S. (2002) Bhutan. (2nd ed.) Melbourne: Lonely Planet.

Populated places in Bhutan